NXT TakeOver: Chicago was the 15th NXT TakeOver and inaugural TakeOver: Chicago professional wrestling livestreaming event produced by WWE. It was held exclusively for wrestlers from the promotion's NXT brand division. The event aired exclusively on the WWE Network and took place on May 20, 2017, at the Allstate Arena in the Chicago suburb of Rosemont, Illinois as part of that year's Backlash weekend.

Five matches were contested at the event. In the main event, The Authors of Pain (Akam and Rezar) defeated DIY (Johnny Gargano and Tommaso Ciampa in a Ladder match to retain the NXT Tag Team Championship. In other prominent matches, Pete Dunne defeated Tyler Bate to win the WWE United Kingdom Championship, Asuka defeated Nikki Cross and Ruby Riot in a triple threat match to retain the NXT Women's Championship, and Bobby Roode defeated Hideo Itami to retain the NXT Championship in the penultimate match.

Production

Background
TakeOver was a series of professional wrestling shows that began in May 2014, as WWE's then-developmental league NXT held their second WWE Network-exclusive event, billed as TakeOver. In subsequent months, the "TakeOver" moniker became the brand used by WWE for all of their NXT live specials. TakeOver: Chicago was scheduled as the 15th NXT TakeOver event and was held on May 20, 2017, as a support show for that year's Backlash pay-per-view. It was held at the Allstate Arena in Rosemont, Illinois. Rosemont is a suburb of Chicago from which the event takes its name.

Storylines

The card comprised five matches. The matches resulted from scripted storylines, where wrestlers portrayed heroes, villains, or less distinguishable characters that built tension and culminated in a wrestling match or series of matches. Results were predetermined by WWE's writers on the NXT brand, while storylines were produced on their weekly television program, NXT.

At TakeOver: Orlando, Bobby Roode retained the NXT Championship over Shinsuke Nakamura. The following Wednesday on NXT, Roode came out and insulted Nakamura. Hideo Itami interrupted Roode's speech, slapped him and attacked him with a GTS. The following week on NXT, general manager William Regal made a title match between the two official for TakeOver: Chicago.

Asuka successfully defended the NXT Women's Championship against Ember Moon at TakeOver: Orlando, but during the match, Asuka shoved the referee onto Moon to avoid Moon's finisher, the Eclipse, continuing Asuka's transition into a villainess that began at TakeOver: Toronto. On the May 3 NXT, Moon, Ruby Riott, and Nikki Cross were the final three combatants remaining in a #1 Contender's Battle Royal. During the match, Asuka attacked all three women, resulting in a no contest and cementing Asuka's heel turn. After the match, William Regal announced that Asuka will defend the NXT Women's Championship against Moon, Riot, and Cross in a Fatal 4-Way match at TakeOver: Chicago. However, Moon suffered a legitimate shoulder injury after being thrown out of the ring awkwardly during Asuka's attack. Therefore, Moon was pulled out of the match, making the match a triple threat.

On May 6, during at a United Kingdom Championship Tournament live event, Tyler Bate defeated Joseph Conners to retain the WWE United Kingdom Championship. Following the match, it was announced that on May 7 at the United Kingdom Championship Special, Bate would defend his title against Mark Andrews, who had become the number one contender after defeating James Drake. Bate would go on and win the match. Also on May 7, Pete Dunne defeated Trent Seven to become the new number one contender for the United Kingdom Championship at TakeOver: Chicago.

Event

Preliminary matches 
In the opening match, Eric Young faced Roderick Strong. Strong performed "End of Heartache" on Young to win the match.

Next, Tyler Bate defended the WWE United Kingdom Championship against Pete Dunne. In the climax, Dunne performed the "Bitter End" on Bate to win the title. The match was rated 4.75 stars by journalist Dave Meltzer, tying for Meltzer's best-reviewed WWE match of 2017 thus far. The match was also voted as the NXT Match of the Year.

Afterwards, Asuka defended the NXT Women's Championship against Ruby Riott and Nikki Cross in a triple threat match. The ending saw Asuka perform a running knee smash on Riot and pin both women to retain the title.

In the penultimate match, Bobby Roode defended the NXT Championship against Hideo Itami. Roode performed a "Glorious DDT" on Itami for a near-fall. Itami performed a "GTS" on Roode, who rolled out of the ring, and scored a near-fall. Itami attempted a second "GTS" on Roode, who countered and performed two consecutive "Glorious DDTs" on Itami to retain the title.

Main event 
In the main event, The Authors of Pain (Akam and Rezar) defended the NXT Tag Team Championship against DIY (Johnny Gargano and Tommaso Ciampa) in a ladder match. Gargano performed a splash off a ladder onto Akam, who was lay on a ladder bridged between the ring apron and the barricade, whilst Ciampa performed a splash off the ladder through a ladder, which was also bridged, on Rezar. After Paul Ellering interfered, Gargano performed a superkick on Ellering. Ciampa performed a German suplex through a ladder, which was positioned in the corner, on Rezar. Gargano and Ciampa performed "Meeting in the Middle" into a ladder, which Akam was trapped in. Gargano and Ciampa attempted to retrieve the title belts but Akam and Rezar performed powerbombs on Gargano and Ciampa. Akam and Rezar then performed the "Super Collider" on Gargano and Ciampa. Akam and Rezar retrieved the title belts to retain the title.

After the match, Ciampa attacked Gargano and performed two running knee smashes on Gargano, turning heel. Ciampa performed an "Air Raid Crash" through two tables near the announce table on Gargano. Medical personnel checked on Gargano as the event ended.

Aftermath
The 2017 TakeOver: Chicago would be the first of two events in a TakeOver: Chicago chronology, a subseries of TakeOvers that were held at the Allstate Arena in the Chicago suburb of Rosemont, Illinois. TakeOver: WarGames in 2019 would also be held at the Allstate Arena, but it was part of the WarGames chronology.

Results

References

External links 
 

Chicago
2017 WWE Network events
2017 in Illinois
Professional wrestling in the Chicago metropolitan area
Events in Rosemont, Illinois
May 2017 events in the United States